is a Japanese sprinter. He competed in the men's 100 metres, the men's 200 metres, and the men's 4x100 metres relay at the 1956 Summer Olympics.

References

External links
 

1932 births
Living people
Athletes (track and field) at the 1956 Summer Olympics
Japanese male sprinters
Olympic athletes of Japan
Place of birth missing (living people)
Asian Games medalists in athletics (track and field)
Asian Games gold medalists for Japan
Athletes (track and field) at the 1954 Asian Games
Medalists at the 1954 Asian Games
20th-century Japanese people
21st-century Japanese people